Athens College (formally Hellenic-American Educational Foundation (HAEF)) is a co-educational private preparatory school in Psychiko, Greece, a suburb of Athens, part of the Hellenic-American Educational Foundation (Ελληνοαμερικανικό Εκπαιδευτικό Ίδρυμα) which also includes Psychico College, although both schools are usually referred to as "Athens College". It was established in 1925 to bring the best of both Greek and American educational systems to Greece and is considered one of the top schools in the country.  The school's founders and big donors were Emmanuel Benakis, namesake of the Benaki Museum of Athens, as well as the school's main building, and Stephanos Deltas.  Instruction is in both Greek and English. The school boasts a long list of successful alumni in politics, business, and the arts. Admission at either the 1st, 4th, 7th or 10th grade is very selective. The school is often referred to as a power hub, due to its numerous influential alumni who remain closely connected after graduation.

Overview 

The 3,000 students are divided among Athens and Psychico College, each of which includes a Kindergarten, an Elementary School, a middle school, and an upper school. The upper school of Psychico College also offers students interested in studies abroad the International Baccalaureate programme. In addition the adult education program enrolls 2,000 students.

Approximately 98% of its graduates go on to university, half of them abroad.

Athens College is known for hosting an annual school fair (Panigiri), which raises money for charity and attracts people from all around Athens and other schools.

Athens College has a long tradition in oratory/rhetoric competitions. Starting with the Three Hierarch speech competition in 10th grade and 25 March speech competition in 11th grade, the school's oratory competitions apex with the two Senior Speech competitions, Delta and Howland. The Howland prize is given to the one student who excels in public speaking in the Greek Language and the Delta Prize is given to the student whose English speech is selected first among his peers for both its content and its delivery. Both competitions include the approximately 400 students of each graduating class and have semi-finals and finals with different judging committees usually composed of people from the realm of education, diplomacy, and politics. The winners of the two competitions deliver their speeches at Commencement in July, in front of thousands of attendees.

Athens College has a great tradition in mathematics competitions. The school's students are prepared in the school's Mathematics Club. Many of the school's representatives over the past few years have succeeded in national and international competitions. Also notable are the school's distinctions in competitions such as AMC 8, AMC 10 and AIME.  The school's Drama Club has begun a tradition the last years by earning numerous prizes, distinctions and awards in national and regional tournaments.

Athens College's library is one of the largest school libraries in Europe and was the first in Greece to have all its books electronically cataloged. The sporting facilities of Athens College include a gym, two football pitches (one gravel), seven outdoor basketball courts, four outdoor tennis courts, an indoor swimming pool, a track & field court, and an indoor sports center with facilities for squash, table tennis, gymnastics, volleyball, martial arts, and other events.

Athens College is incorporated in both Greece and the State of New York and is a not-for-profit, tax-exempt organization. Furthermore, very important for the school's spirit and an indication of its special status is its scholarship program (funded by the parents associations and the alumni club SAKA) which has given numerous students from all socioeconomic layers the opportunity to study there.

History 

Athens College was established in 1925 by a group of enlightened Greeks (Emmanuel Benakis and Stephanos Delta among them) with the support of American philhellenes, including Dr. Bert Hodge, Director of the American School of Classical Studies at Athens.

The Founders’ vision, which in fact was translated into reality even in the earliest years of the school's existence, revolved around the creation of a school which fostered the "harmonious development of students’ intellectual, ethical and physical capabilities, especially character" by enhancing the existing educational system with "modern educational methods which took into account the Greek nation’s history, traditions, culture and specific needs."

Athens College, 1925–1980

The Founding Committee of Athens College, which became its board of directors, was organized in May 1924. Its members were Epaminondas Charilaos, President of the Chamber of Commerce and Industry, Bert Hodge Hill, Director of the American School of Classical Studies, Stephanos Delta, retired businessman and treasurer of the Refugee Settlement Commission, Stavros Papadakis, YMCA. secretary, Emmanuel Benakis, retired businessman, former Minister and former Mayor of Athens, Petros Calligas, former Minister, Harold Jacquith, Director of the Near East Relief, Nicolas Kyriakides, shipowner. Later, Emmanuel Benakis who has been a major donator for the college, was named emeritus member and was replaced at the committee by his son Antonios.

The institution has been officially recognized with the title "Hellenic-American Educational Foundation". The courses began in October 1925 with 15 pupils (it was a school for boys). A building was rented at Androu Street for $215 per month, and Emmanuel Benakis and Stephanos Delta covered the first expenses (£2000). The first Headmaster of the college was the Englishman F. Stroud Read. The American Homer Davis, former teacher at Robert College of Constantinople, had in charge the English Department. Stephanos Delta provided for some years the needed funds for the operation of the School.

In 1926 the Greek-American Evripides Kehayas, president of Standard Commercial Tobacco Co., offered $100,000 to the college. In January 1927, a "Board of Trustees of Athens College in Greece" was founded at New York. The same year, Argie02 offered to the college another $100,000 to buy land at Psychico, suburbs of Athens. Later, Benakis and Delta offered a huge supplement of $500,000. Other Greek personalities, as Eleftherios Venizelos, provided more funds. A new building began to be constructed in March 1927.
Athens College begun its operation at the new building, called Benaki Hall, in autumn 1928, with 270 pupils, 91 being boarders. President of the college from 1927 was Dr. Henry Dewing. The official opening of Benaki Hall and of the Kehayas aisle took place in May 1929. In June of the same year, graduated the first five pupils.

During the academic year 1930–31, the number of the pupils reached 351, and the number of professors 44 (9 were Americans, the rest of them Greek). A seventh year was then added to the six-year Gymnasium. This supplementary year will be a particularity of Athens College.

During the 1930s, the college had many economic difficulties, and new collects were then organized. With money from various sponsors, new buildings have been constructed, the library has been founded as well a scholarship fund.
Homer Davis, who was acting director of the college after the departure of Dewing in 1930, was named its president in 1932. He will keep this charge until 1960, and will be Acting President in 1964–65. The Greek co-directors during those years, were Michael Michaelides-Nouaros (1925–27), Demetrius Georgakis (1927–36), Emmanuel Troulinos (1936–62), Constantine Lalopoulos (1962–73) and Sofocles Markianos (1973–78).

The first school-laboratories have been organized in Athens College during the 1930s, by professor of physics Panos Mavromatis. Four rooms have been provided for laboratories of physics, of chemistry, of biology and of geology. The experimental teaching has been from then a main educational policy of the college. From Athens College graduated many eminent Greek scientists, artists and politicians. This college has been an institution preparing Greek students to enter English and U.S. universities.

In 1974, after the Turkish invasion of Cyprus, Athens College accepted 30 Greek Cypriot refugees into the College Boarding Department and gave them full scholarships.

Athens College, 1980–today

Athens College (and its sister school, Psychico College, founded in 1980) is owned by the Hellenic-American Educational Foundation, a non-profit organization with facilities located in Psychico (Middle and High Schools and the International Baccalaureate Diploma Program) and Kantza in eastern Attica (two elementary schools: Bodossakio and Latsio).

When it first began, in October 1925, Athens College occupied a rented building on 18 Androu Street in the heart of Athens. The school moved to Psychico in 1929. That same year, the Benaki Hall was dedicated by Eleftherios Venizelos, then Greece's Prime Minister and an ardent supporter of the school. In his speech during the dedication ceremony, Venizelos made some memorable remarks:

"... Private schools are where the greatest and most successful innovations may flourish: loosely supervised by the State and complying with broad State guidelines, private schools enjoy the freedom which public schools lack and, therefore, may achieve great progress. This is the kind of progress we expect Athens College to achieve. This is my judgment of the significance of the College."

Notable alumni

Government and politics 

 Andreas Papandreou (1938), economist and politician; served three times as Prime Minister of Greece (1981–1985, 1985–1989, 1993–1996).
 George Papandreou (1971), former Prime Minister of Greece from 2009 to 2011; Foreign Minister 1999 to 2004.
Lucas Papademos (1966), a former caretaker Prime Minister of Greece. Also, an economist and former Vice President of the European Central Bank
Antonis Samaras (1970), former Prime Minister of Greece from 2012 to 2015.
 Stavros Lambrinidis (1980), Ambassador of the European Union to the United States.
Kyriakos Mitsotakis (1986), Greek Prime Minister since 2019.

Academics 
 Michael Dertouzos (1954), former director of the M.I.T. Laboratory for Computer Science, and chairman of the Athens College Board of Trustees.
 Costis Maglaras (1987), dean of Columbia Business School.
Yiannis N. Moschovakis (1956), set theorist at UCLA.
 Alexander Nehamas (1964), academic, professor of Humanities, Philosophy and Comparative Literature at Princeton University.
 Nikiforos Diamandouros (1961), academic, European Ombudsman (2003–2013).
Anthony Kaldellis Professor of Classics and Byzantinist, Ohio State University.
Dimitris Krallis Professor of Humanities, Byzantinist, and Director of the Stavros Niarchos Foundation Centre for Hellenic Studies at Simon Fraser University.
Peter Diamandopoulos, academic, President of Sonoma State University (1977–1983) and Adelphi University (1985–1997)

Business and finance 
 Stavros S. Niarchos (1928), Greek shipping magnate
Costas Lemos (1936), shipping magnate
Spiros Latsis (1965), shipping magnate and founder of Eurobank Ergasias
Giannis Vardinogiannis (1980), shipping magnate
George Prokopiou (1964), shipowner, founder of Dynacom Tankers, Sea Traders and Dynagas.
Georgios Vernicos (1968), Greek entrepreneur, social activist.
George Economou (1972), shipbuilder

Literature and art 
 Nikos Dimou (1954), writer and broadcaster
Apostolos Doxiadis (1972), author of international bestsellers Uncle Petros and Goldbach's Conjecture (1992) and Logicomix (2009).

Athletics 
Maria Sakkari (2013), professional tennis player, ranked as high as world No. 3 by Women's Tennis Association

References

Sources 
 Homer W. Davis, The story of Athens College: The first thirty-five years, 1925–1960, . Davis was its first president.
 Δημήτρη Καραμάνου, Κολλέγιον Αθηνών, 1925–2000:  Σταθμοί και Ορόσημα.

External links 
 Athens College website 
 American site 
 Σύλλογος Γονέων & Κηδεμόνων των μαθητών του Κολλεγίου Αθηνών (1977) 
 Athens College alumni website 

Educational institutions established in 1925
Private schools in Greece
Education in Athens
1925 establishments in Greece